
Restaurant Halvemaan is a former restaurant in Amsterdam, Netherlands. It is a fine dining restaurant that was awarded one Michelin star in 1991 and retained that rating until 1997. The restaurant closed at 28 October 2018.

In 2013, GaultMillau awarded the restaurant 16 out of 20 points.

Owner and head chef of Halvemaan is John Halvemaan.

The building of the restaurant is a purpose built restaurant designed by Alexander Bodon. It is located in a park in the neighbourhood Buitenveldert. The restaurant opened in 1989.

See also
List of Michelin starred restaurants in the Netherlands

References 

Restaurants in Amsterdam
Michelin Guide starred restaurants in the Netherlands